Clubul Sportiv Municipal Slatina, commonly known as CSM Slatina or simply Slatina, is a Romanian football club based in Slatina, Olt County, which competes in the Liga II. 

The club was founded in 2009 as CSM Slatina, quickly obtaining two consecutive promotions to reach the Liga II in 2011. That summer, it merged with FC Piatra Olt and moved from Slatina to Piatra Olt, also changing its name to FC Olt Slatina. At the end of its  debut season in the second league, FC Olt was relegated, but then merged again with another club from Slatina, Alro Slatina. Technically, the new entity was a continuation of Alro Slatina, but with the name of FC Olt Slatina, whereas the original FC Olt Slatina—or the former CSM Slatina—was dissolved. 

The former Alro Slatina was also dissolved four years later. In February 2018, the club was refounded and enrolled directly in the Liga V, where it played 15 matches from the remainder of that season.

History

The club was founded under the name of CSM Slatina in the summer of 2009, with the financial support of the Municipality of Slatina. The team was promoted to Liga III, the third division of Romanian football, in 2010 as CSM won the Liga IV – Olt County without losing a point in 29 matches. In the 2010–11 season they promoted again, this time to Liga II, as the champions of the Seria IV.

Doubts over the club's future emerged in June 2011 when the local council withdrew its funding. "Yes, the team is dying." said chairman Minel Prina. "The mayor made this sacrifice for Alro Slatina to be promoted to Liga I. All of the money went there." Players were told that they were free to join other clubs while negotiations over a potential merger took place. The club's future was secured in July when private investors from Olt County pledged to support CSM financially. "As promised to the mayor, the team will remain in Olt County, but must be converted from public to private." said Prina. In August, the club merged with FC Piatra Olt and their name was changed to FC Olt Slatina. The decision meant that two clubs from the region would compete in Liga II, FC Olt and Alro.

The team finished 13th in their first season in the Liga II, winning nine of their 30 matches in Seria II and were 14 points clear of the relegation places. The club was dissolved in the summer of 2012 due to organisational changes as a result of Alro separating from the sports club that ran it. Alro would continue in Liga II and take the club's name, and the 2009 club would disband.

In the summer of 2016 FC Olt Slatina (former Alro) was also dissolved, fact that led to the reestablishment of CSM Slatina a year and a half later. The club was enrolled in the Liga V – Olt County and finished only 8th in the first series, due to the fact that it was only enrolled in the competition during the winter break, playing only the second part of the season. In the summer of 2018 the club was invited in the Liga IV, Bobi Verdeș was hired as the new coach, being transferred also some valuable players, with the clear goal, promotion to Liga III.

Honours

Leagues
Liga III
Winners (3): 2010–11, 2019–20, 2021–22
Liga IV – Olt County
Winners (2): 2009–10, 2018–19

Cups
Cupa României – Olt County
Winners (2): 2017–18, 2018–19

Players

First-team squad

Out on loan

Club officials

Board of directors

Current technical staff

League history

References

External links
 Official Website 
 

Olt County
Sport in Slatina, Romania
Football clubs in Olt County
Association football clubs established in 2009
Liga II clubs
Liga III clubs
Liga IV clubs
2009 establishments in Romania